Armillaria socialis is a species of fungus in the family Physalacriaceae. It is a plant pathogen. Originally described by Augustin Pyramus de Candolle in 1815, it was transferred to Armillaria by Victor Fayod in 1889. It is found in Asia, Europe, and North America.

See also
List of Armillaria species

References

Fungal plant pathogens and diseases
socialis
Fungi described in 1815
Fungi of Asia
Fungi of Europe
Fungi of North America
Taxa named by Augustin Pyramus de Candolle